Chalone Vineyard is located in the Chalone AVA south of San Francisco, California, United States, on an unusual geological formation called the Gavilan benchland. The soil is rich in limestone and calcium carbonate and also contains a significant amount of decomposed granite. This soil has a mineral composition similar to the Champagne region of France. Chalone is situated in an arid chaparral environment, in which temperatures can vary as much as 50°F in one day. These factors combine to create a unique terroir, the signature profile of a wine growing region.

History 

The original vineyard was planted in the 1890s by a Frenchman, Charles L. Tamm, who thought the soil similar to that in Burgundy. In 1964, the property was purchased by new owners with a commitment to producing fine wine. Under the guidance of California wine pioneer Richard H. Graff, the vineyard expanded when new vineyards were planted and the winery was moved from a converted chicken shed to a bigger location adjacent to where a newer (and much larger) winery stands today. 

Graff wanted to establish a Burgundian-Style, top-flight Chardonnay, and with his brothers, John Graff and Peter Watson-Graff, began producing some of the earliest barrel-fermented and aged wines in the United States. In addition to introducing California to oak barrels, Graff brought to California the process of malolactic fermentation in white wines.  In 1971 he was joined by Phillip Woodward and the two began what would later become the Chalone Wine Group. The finishing of Chardonnays with oak barrel fermentation/ aging and the addition of the malolactic process makes the Chards similar to the Bourgogne rule book.

Chalone Vineyard achieved third rank out of ten from France and the U.S. in the historic Judgment of Paris wine competition. All 11 judges awarded their top scores to either Chalone Vineyard or Chateau Montelena, also of California.

Chalone grew and prospered first with Richard Graff and brothers John and Peter Watson-Graff, then Michael Michaud as winemaker. During this time the Chalone Wine Group  expanded to include six wineries in California and two in Washington.  Chalone Wine Group also owned about 24% of the Chateau Duhart-Milon estate in France.  In 2005, Chalone Wine Group was purchased by beverage giant Diageo. In early 2016 it was sold to Foley Family Wines. 

Today, Chalone Vineyard produces Chardonnay, Pinot noir, Pinot blanc, Chenin blanc, Syrah, Grenache and Grenache Rose.

See also
Chalone AVA
California wine

References

Further reading
Taber, George M. Judgment of Paris: California vs. France and the Historic 1976 Paris Tasting that Revolutionized Wine. NY: Schribner, 2005.
Woodward, Phillip and Walter, Gregory S. Chalone: A Journey on the Wine Frontier. Sonoma, CA: Carneros Press, 2000.

External links
Chalone Vineyard

1890s establishments in California
Wineries in California
Companies based in Monterey County, California
Diageo brands